Michael Jon Wood (born 17 March 1976) is a British Conservative Party politician. He has been the Member of Parliament (MP) for Dudley South since May 2015.

Early life and career
Wood was born on 17 March 1976. He attended Old Swinford Hospital – a state-run boarding school in Oldswinford, before studying Economics & Law at Aberystwyth University. He completed a Bar Vocational Course at Cardiff University in 1999. After graduating from university, Wood went to work for Alexander Macmillan, 2nd Earl of Stockton, Conservative MEP for South West England. Following this, he worked for four years as a policy advisor in the European Parliament, before returning to the UK to work for the Conservative MPs Andrew Griffiths and James Morris.

Political career
Shortly after completing his undergraduate degree, Wood first stood for office as a Conservative Party candidate in 1998 when he competed in the Quarry Bank & Cradley ward on Dudley Metropolitan Borough Council. He was unsuccessful, gaining less than half of the votes of his Labour Party rival. He stood in the same ward in May 1999, again losing by a similar margin. He stood in the Quarry Bank & Dudley Wood ward in 2008, 2010 and 2011 and was defeated by the Labour candidate on all three occasions. In May 2012, Wood again stood unsuccessfully, but in the Halesowen North ward. However, he was elected as one of three councillors representing the ward of Pedmore and Stourbridge East in May 2014.

The following year, Wood was elected as MP for Dudley South and made his maiden speech in the House of Commons on 1 June 2015.

He was successful in the ballot held on 4 June 2015 to obtain the right to introduce a Private Members' Bill. The first reading of the bill entitled Riot Compensation was held on 24 June 2015. The Bill aimed to repeal the Riot (Damages) Act 1886 and make various changes to the procedures of obtaining compensation for property damaged in riots. The Bill passed through all the stages of debate and scrutiny in the UK Parliament and received royal assent on 23 March 2016. It became an Act of Parliament on 24 March 2016.

In May 2016, it was reported that Wood was one of a number of Conservative MPs being investigated by police in the 2015 general election party spending investigation, for allegedly spending more than the legal limit on constituency election campaign expenses. In May 2017, the Crown Prosecution Service said that while there was evidence of inaccurate spending returns, it did not "meet the test" for further action.

In the House of Commons he sat on the European Scrutiny Committee between November 2016 and May 2017. He was supportive of Brexit prior to the 2016 referendum.

Wood has served as Parliamentary Private Secretary (PPS) to Secretary of State for International Trade Liam Fox and Home Secretary Priti Patel. In the 2021 cabinet reshuffle he was appointed PPS to Deputy Prime Minister Dominic Raab. 

Wood served as a full member of the Organization for Security and Co-operation in Europe delegation from the UK Parliament. On 12 January 2022 Prime Minister Boris Johnson announced Wood had been replaced in this role by Mark Pritchard.

References

External links

1976 births
Living people
Conservative Party (UK) MPs for English constituencies
People educated at Old Swinford Hospital
UK MPs 2015–2017
UK MPs 2017–2019
UK MPs 2019–present
Councillors in the West Midlands (county)